Per Erik Løkken (born 25 June 1956) is a Norwegian sports shooter. He competed in the men's 10 metre air rifle event at the 1984 Summer Olympics.

References

External links
 

1956 births
Living people
Norwegian male sport shooters
Olympic shooters of Norway
Shooters at the 1984 Summer Olympics
People from Østre Toten
Sportspeople from Innlandet
20th-century Norwegian people